Kadam Singh was a leader of a group of Gurjars who fought against the British East India Company during the Indian Rebellion of 1857. During the rebellion, he was the raja of Parikshitgarh and Mawana in Meerut district.

References

Indian rebels
People from Meerut district
Revolutionaries of the Indian Rebellion of 1857
19th-century Indian people
Indian independence activists from Uttar Pradesh
History of Meerut
1820 births
1857 deaths